Karlstad BK was a Swedish football club located in Karlstad in Värmland County. They merged with Carlstad United after the 2019 season to form IF Karlstad Fotboll.

Background

Since their foundation on 19 October 1923 Karlstad BK has participated mainly in the second and third tiers of the Swedish football league system. As of 2012 the club currently plays in Division 1 Södra, which is in the third tier of Swedish football. This was not the case in recent years—from 2000 to 2007 KBK were playing in Div 4 Värmland which was the fifth tier and then the sixth tier from 2006. Promotions in 2007 and again in 2009 have enabled the club to restore some pride, especially as they pipped local rivals FBK Karlstad to the play-off spot. They play their home matches at the Våxnäs IP and Tingvalla IP in Karlstad.

The club is affiliated to the Värmlands Fotbollförbund.

Season to season

Attendances

In recent seasons Karlstad BK have had the following average attendances:

External links
 Karlstad BK – Official Website

Footnotes

Sport in Karlstad
Defunct football clubs in Sweden
Association football clubs established in 1923
Association football clubs disestablished in 2019
1923 establishments in Sweden